Harold Bamford Richardson (10 March 1873 – 18 April 1906) was an English first-class cricketer active 1898–99 who played for Surrey. He was born in Rochdale.

After his career with Surrey, Richardson spent several years in San Francisco, where he was prominent in local cricket. He was killed in the 1906 San Francisco earthquake.

References

1873 births
1906 deaths
English cricketers
Surrey cricketers
Deaths in earthquakes